Biplab is a given name. Notable people with the name include:

Biplab Chatterjee, Indian actor
Biplab Dasgupta, Indian politician
Biplab Kumar Deb, Indian politician, Chief Minister of Tripura since 2018
Biplab Mitra, India politician
Biplab Saikia, Indian cricketer
Biplab Samantray, Indian cricketer